Robert-Jan Smits (born 1958) is the President of the Executive Board of the Eindhoven University of Technology in the Netherlands since May 2019. In 2018-2019, he was a senior adviser for open access and innovation at the European Political Strategy Centre and from 2010 to 2018, he served as director-general of research and innovation (RTD) at the European Commission. He is known for his key roles in planning Plan S, to ensure that all publicly funded scientific publications are available in Open Access by 2020, as well as for being one of the main architects of Horizon 2020.

Early life and education 
Robert-Jan Smits was born in 1958 in the Netherlands. He has degrees from Utrecht University in the Netherlands, Graduate Institute of International and Development Studies in Switzerland, and Fletcher School of Law & Diplomacy in the United States.

Following his studies, Smits worked for the Dutch Ministry of Economic Affairs from 1985 to 1989, and left in 1989 to work at the European Commission.

Career and impact 
Smits is considered one of the main architects of Horizon 2020, an EU Research and Innovation program providing €80 billion of funding between 2014 and 2020. Smits has also played leading roles in developing the European Research Council, the European Research Area, and the European Strategy Forum on Research Infrastructures.

Recently, Smits has spearheaded the Plan S initiative, which requires scientists make their publications open-access immediately on publication. 11 national funding agencies in Europe, who collectively spend €7.6 billion in research grants per year, have signed up to Plan S.

Awards and honors 

 Honorary degree from the University of Edinburgh (2016)
 Lifetime achievements award from EuroScience (2016)
 Academy Medal from the Royal Netherlands Academy of Arts and Sciences (2017)
 Excellence in Global Science award in South-Africa (2017)
 Nature's 10 (2018)

Writings 

 Plan S for shock (with Rachael Pells)

See also 

 Plan S

References 

1958 births
living people
Dutch civil servants
Graduate Institute of International and Development Studies alumni
Members of Academia Europaea